This is a list of Holocaust victims whose writings were published posthumously.

Published in English or translated into English

Hinde Bergner (1870–1942): On Long Winter Nights: Memoirs of a Jewish Family in a Galician Township, 1870–1900
Hélène Berr (1921–1945): The Journal of Hélène Berr
Miriam Chaszczewacki (1924–1942): Diary
Abraham Cytryn (1927–1944): Youth Writing Behind the Walls: Notebooks From the Lodz Ghetto
Adam Czerniaków (1880–1942): The Warsaw Diary of Adam Czerniakow: Prelude to Doom
Julius Feldman (1923–1943): The Krakow Diary of Julius Feldman
Sarah Fishkin (1924–1942?): Heaven and Earth: the Diary of Sarah Fishkin
Moshe Flinker (1926–1944): Young Moshe’s Diary: The Spiritual Torment of a Jewish Boy in Nazi Europe
Anne Frank (1929–1945): The Diary of a Young Girl
Petr Ginz (1928–1944): The Diary of Petr Ginz
Éva Heyman (1931–1944): The Diary of Éva Heyman
Etty Hillesum (1914–1943): An Interrupted Life: the Diaries of Etty Hillesum, 1941-1943
Chaim Aron Kaplan (1880–1942): Scroll of Agony: The Warsaw Diary of Chaim A. Kaplan
Elsa Katz (d. 1944): A Theresienstadt Diary: Letters to Veruska
Aryeh Klonicki (1906–1943): The Diary of Adam's Father
Věra Kohnová (1929–1942): The Diary
David Koker (1921-1945): At the Edge of the Abyss: A Concentration Camp Diary, 1943-1944
Janusz Korczak (1878–1942): Ghetto Diary
Herman Kruk (1897–1944): The Last Days of the Jerusalem of Lithuania: Chronicles from the Vilna Ghetto and the Camps 1939-1944
Rutka Laskier (1929–1943): Rutka's Notebook
Abraham Lewin (1893–1943): A Cup of Tears: A Diary of the Warsaw Ghetto
Ruthka Lieblich (1926–1942?): Ruthka: a Diary of War
Rywka Lipszyc (1929–1945): The Diary of Rywka Lipszyc
Jacques Lusseyran (1924–1971): And There Was Light: autobiography of Jacques Lusseyran, blind hero of the French Resistance
Ruth Maier (1920–1942): Ruth Maier's Diary: A Young Girl's Life Under Nazism
Philip Mechanicus (1889–1944): Year of Fear: a Jewish Prisoner Waits for Auschwitz (also titled In Dépôt and Waiting for Death).
Irène Némirovsky (1903–1942): Suite Française; Fire in the Blood; All Our Worldly Goods; The Wine of Solitude
Egon Redlich (1916–1944): The Terezin Diary of Gonda Redlich
Oskar Rosenfeld (1884–1944): In the Beginning Was the Ghetto: Notebooks from Lodz
Dawid Rubinowicz (1927–1942): The Diary of Dawid Rubinowicz
Yitskhok Rudashevski (1927–1943): Diary of the Vilna Ghetto
Magda Riederman Schloss (1920–2015): We Were Strangers: The Story of Magda Preiss
Dawid Sierakowiak (1924–1943): The Diary of Dawid Sierakowiak: Five Notebooks from the Lodz Ghetto
Philip Slier (1923–1943): Hidden Letters
Renia Spiegel (1924–1942) Renia's Diary: A Holocaust Journal
Jerzy Feliks Urman (1932–1943): I'm Not Even a Grownup: The Diary of Jerzy Feliks Urman
Hilde Verdoner-Sluizer (1909–1944): Signs of Life: The Letters of Hilde Verdoner-Sluizer from Nazi Transit Camp Westerbork, 1942-1944
Béla Weichherz (1892–1942): In Her Father's Eyes: A Childhood Extinguished by the Holocaust
Gertrude Zeisler (1889–1942): I Did Not Survive: Letters from the Kielce Ghetto

Published in other languages and not translated into English

 Jacques Bielinski (1930–1942): Journal 1940–1942. Un journaliste juif à Paris sous l'Occupation.
 Helga Deen (1925–1943): Dit is om nooit meer te vergeten : dagboek en brieven van Helga Deen, 1943.

References

Holocaust victims
Holocaust
Posthumous

Works published posthumously